(died 1576) was a Japanese samurai of the Sengoku period, who ruled an area in central Shinano Province (modern-day Nagano Prefecture. Takanashi Masayori was his son.

Daimyo
Samurai
1576 deaths
Takanashi clan
Year of birth unknown